Sunny and Shay are a British Radio presenting husband and wife duo consisting of Mandeep "Sunny" and Gursharonjit "Shay" Grewal, both from London.

Career 
Sunny and Shay present a number of shows including the BBC WM afternoon slot for which they became the first high profile Asian presenters to do so in addition to the BBC Asian Network and BBC Radio London.

They became a household name after appearing on the Channel 4 show The Family in 2008.

They support and attend a number of high profile events throughout the year including the Asian Awards and the Indian Film Festival. They co-hosted the Brit Asia TV Music Awards with Sukhi Bart, in 2014 and 2015. In 2019 Shay also hosted the first Asian woman festival.

Prior to becoming radio presenters Sunny worked as a BAA security officer at Heathrow Airport and Shay was a HR consultant in the City.

Awards and recognition 

 They are annually featured in the Asian power couples list.
In August 2019 they won the New York Festival radio award.
In November 2017 they won the GG2 Media & Creative Arts Award.
 In May 2017 Shay was presented with the Asian Women of Achievement Award by Cherie Blair and named the Media Award Winner.
In December 2016 Shay was ranked as one of the top 10 inspirational Sikh women in Britain.

Personal life 
In 2017 they announced they were expecting a baby and in 2018 they were featured in Channel 4's documentary One Born Every Minute as millions viewed Shay give birth to their daughter.

See also 
 List of British Sikhs

References

External links
Sunny and Shay (BBC Radio London)

Living people
Year of birth missing (living people)
Radio presenters from London
BBC Asian Network presenters
Press TV people
Participants in British reality television series
British Sikhs
British people of Punjabi descent